Agapetes (Gk. ἀγαπητός (agapetos) = 'beloved')  is a semi-climbing shrub genus native to the Himalayas, grown as an ornamental for its attractive pendulous bunches of red tubular flowers blooming over a long period. It is mostly grown in climates from cool temperate to sub-tropical. Propagation is from cuttings. Agapetes has 245 species and 147 are accepted out of 245.

In the UK, the cultivar ‘Ludgvan Cross’ has gained the Royal Horticultural Society’s Award of Garden Merit.

Species 
Species as of 2020 from eflora China and Plants of the world

References 

 Ellison, Don (1999) Cultivated Plants of the World. London: New Holland (1st ed.: Brisbane: Flora Publications International, 1995).

External links

 Encyclopedia of Life entry
 Botanica Sistematica

Vaccinioideae
Ericaceae genera